International Association for Jazz Education (IAJE), formerly a not-for-profit corporation based in Manhattan, Kansas, was a volunteer-run organization that, among other things, allocated student scholarships through its approved festivals program.  Its annual conference was a gathering point for professional artists as well as jazz enthusiasts.  Many considered IAJE to be a foundation of the jazz community, and its many programs to be a cornerstone of jazz education.

IAJE was first incorporated as a non-profit on August 18, 1989, having developed from the International Association of Jazz Educators (since 1971) and the U.S. National Association of Jazz Education (since 1968). The association organized more than 7,000 teachers, musicians, producers, and others interested in jazz, from more than thirty countries. They organized a yearly conference, which included numerous musical presentations.

IAJE filed for bankruptcy April 2008, and ceased as a corporation March 15, 2009.  The bankruptcy filing was necessitated, in part, because of financial problems stemming from a lack of donations, and losses – notably from the small turnout at the Toronto conference of 2008.

IAJE Jazz Educators Hall of Fame 

Each year the IAJE leadership selected recipients for the Jazz Education Hall of Fame from nominations received from the IAJE membership. The purpose of the Hall of Fame was to honor those individuals whose musical contributions and dedication to jazz education created new directions and curricular innovations for jazz education worldwide.

 1978 Matt Betton
 1979 Billy Taylor
 1980 Stan Kenton
 1981 Dr. Gene Hall
 1982 David Baker
 1983 John Roberts
 1984 Clark Terry
 1985 Leon Breeden
 1986 Marian McPartland
 1987 Lawrence Berk
 1988 Lionel Hampton, Woody Herman, William Franklin Lee III
 1989 Count Basie, Louis Bellson, Jamey Aebersold
 1990 Louis Armstrong, Rich Matteson, Clem DeRosa
 1991 Duke Ellington, Charlie Parker, Ray Wright
 1992 Benny Carter, J. Richard Dunscomb, Dizzy Gillespie
 1993 Maynard Ferguson, Max Roach, Herb Wong
 1994 Jerry Coker, Willis Conover, Willie Thomas
 1995 Gene Aitken, Doc Severinsen, Ella Fitzgerald
 1996 Herb Pomeroy
 1997 Dr. Warrick Carter
 1998 Larry Ridley
 1999 Robert Curnow, Bunky Green
 2000 David Liebman
 2001 Justin DiCioccio, Phil Nimmons
 2002 Dave Brubeck
 2003 Dan Haerle
 2004 Sammy Nestico
 2005 Bob Morgan
 2006 Lee Eliot Berk
 2007 Frank Mantooth

IAJE Humanitarian Award 
Celebrated Humanitarian Award recipients included drummer Ed Thigpen 2007 and producer George Avakian 2008.

IAJE Jazz Ambassador Award 
The final Jazz Ambassador Award was given to Tom Smith in 2008.

Publications 
 NAJE Newsletter; 
 NAJE Educator – National Association of Jazz Educators News Letter
 (forerunner to Jazz Educators Journal)
 

 Jazz Educators Journal
 
 
 Jazz Educators Journal Index, 1969–1989, Vols. 1–21, Lee Bash, PhD (ed.)
 , 

 A Guide to N.A.J.E. Periodicals, Lee Bash (ed.), National Association of Jazz Educators (198?);

See also
 International Jazz Festivals Organization (IJFO)
 Timeline of jazz education

References

External links

 International Association for Jazz Education (IAJE).  
  International Jazz Festivals Organizations (IJFO)

Jazz organizations
Jazz music education
Jazz awards
Music organizations based in the United States
Organizations established in 1989
Organizations disestablished in 2009
Music education organizations